The team jumping event, part of the equestrian program at the 1992 Summer Olympics was held on 28 July and 9 August 1992 at the Royal Polo Club in Barcelona. The results of the second and third round of the individual jumping were used to award rankings.  Like all other equestrian events, the competition was mixed gender, with both male and female athletes competing in the same division.  Fourteen teams, each consisting of four horse and rider pairs, entered the contest.

Medalists

Results
Each team consisted of four pairs of horse and rider.  The penalty points of the lowest three pairs were added together to reach the team's penalty points.

References

Sources
Source: Official Report of the 1992 Barcelona Summer Olympics available at  https://web.archive.org/web/20060622162855/http://www.la84foundation.org/5va/reports_frmst.htm

Equestrian at the 1992 Summer Olympics